Braojos is a municipality of the autonomous community of Madrid in central Spain. It is located in the comarca of Sierra Norte.

Public transport 
Braojos only has two bus lines, one of them connecting it to Madrid although it only makes a single trip daily. Those lines are: 

195: Madrid - Braojos

191A: Buitrago - Braojos

References

External links

Municipalities in the Community of Madrid